Khun Bedu (born 1984) is an ethnically Karenni Burmese political activist, who was imprisoned from 2008 to 2012 for organizing protests against the 2008 Constitutional Referendum.

Involvement in protests
In 2004, Khun Bedu joined the human rights group Kayan New Generation Youth (KNGY). He was appointed the group's joint secretary on 12 August 2007. In this role, he led trainings on human rights issues, community organizing, constitutional issues, and election systems.

In 2008, the State Peace and Development Council, Burma's military government, announced a referendum for a new constitution which guaranteed that one quarter of all parliamentary seats would be reserved for military officers, that the Ministry of Home Affairs would fall exclusively under military control, and that Burmese citizens married to foreigners would be ineligible for office, apparently disqualifying leading opposition figure and Nobel laureate Aung San Suu Kyi. Aung San Suu Kyi's party, the National League for Democracy, called on eligible citizens to vote "no" in the referendum, and claimed their campaign was violently suppressed by government officials as a result.

Arrest and imprisonment
The KNGY human rights group also announced its opposition to the referendum. Khun Bedu, along with Khun Kawrio and Khun Dee De, reportedly organized members to protest the vote in Loikaw and Demo Soe, Kayah State. On 27 April, the words "no" and "vote no" began to appear on government signs, and on 30 April, group members sprayed a large "X" on a sign by the Loikaw city hall reading "To be a prosperous and developed nation, let’s support the referendum". The protesters also released balloons with attached signs reading "no", sent rafts from banana tree wood or bathing cups floating down the Beluchong River with small flags reading "vote no", and distributed copies of the video of the lavish wedding of Than Shwe's daughter.

On 10 May 2008, authorities arrested Khun Bedu, Khun Kawrio, and Khun Dee De and charged them with organizing the protests against the state. Amnesty International reported that the men were then tortured for fifteen days, with the techniques including beatings by guards, forced kneeling on stones, suffocation with plastic bags, waterboarding, and prolonged exposure to hostile weather. Khun Bedu and Khun Kawrio were sentenced to 37 years of imprisonment apiece, and Khun Dee De to 35 years.

International attention
Khun Bedu served his sentence in Taungoo prison of Bago Division. Amnesty International considered him a prisoner of conscience and called for his immediate release. The British ambassador to Burma reportedly also pressed the government to release Khun Bedu.

In 2010, British Shadow Treasury Minister David Hanson spoke out on behalf of Khun Bedu and other Burmese political prisoners, stating that "Just days before the Burmese elections I want to show my support for those political prisoners who are unfairly imprisoned purely for speaking out against an unjust regime ... We must not forget them and must each do our bit to remind the world of their plight."

Release
According to the Assistance Association for Political Prisoners, Khun Bedu was pardoned on 13 January 2012, as part of a series of amnesties for political prisoners.

References

1984 births
Amnesty International prisoners of conscience held by Myanmar
Burmese democracy activists
Burmese prisoners and detainees
Living people
People from Kayah State